Loc-Envel is a commune in the Côtes-d'Armor department of Brittany in northwestern France.

Toponymy
From the Breton lok which means hermitage (cf.: Locminé), and Envel a Breton saint.

Population
Inhabitants of Loc-Envel are called locquenvellois or loc-envelistes in French.

See also
Communes of the Côtes-d'Armor department
Église Saint-Envel de Loc-Envel

References

External links

Communes of Côtes-d'Armor